Richard Arthur Lesh, Jr. is a professor of learning sciences, cognitive science, and mathematics education at Indiana University in Bloomington, Indiana.  He retired from the IU system in 2012. He graduated from Indiana University in 1971 with a Ph.D. in mathematics, cognitive psychology, and statistics for research in the social sciences.  He is also a graduate of Hanover College, where he received a B.A. in mathematics and physics.

Lesh is the originator of the Models and Modeling Perspectives research area of Mathematics education and as the creator of the model-eliciting activity, which is designed to help reveal thinking processes to students, teachers, and researchers.
In his work life, Lesh has worked at a variety of career positions, including as a National Science Foundation official, dean and professor at Northwestern University, principal research scientist at Educational Testing Services, and endowed professor at both Purdue University and Indiana University, where he tried to develop various alternative assessment techniques that could be used to detect learning traditional assessment strategies did not.

See also
 Systemics
 Design-Based Research

References

External links
 Indiana University Learning Sciences Program
 Rational Number Project

Indiana University alumni
Indiana University faculty
Year of birth missing (living people)
Living people
Hanover College alumni